James Warring (born November 26, 1958) is an American boxer, kickboxer and mixed martial artist. In professional boxing, he held the IBF world cruiserweight title from 1991 until 1992. In kickboxing, Warring is a four-time world champion, which included WKA world titles in 1983 and 1989.

Biography

Career 
 Kickboxing
 US kickboxing champion
 KICK World Cruiserweight Champion
 PKC World Cruiserweight Champion
 FFKA World Super Heavyweight Champion
 WKA World Cruiserweight Champion
 WKA World Heavyweight champion
 Boxing
 NABF Cruiserweight Champion (December 12, 1990 - ?)
 IBF World Cruiserweight Champion (September 7, 1991 – July 30, 1992)
 Mixed Martial Arts
 World Combat Championship Runner-Up (1995)

Career after fighting
As of 2002, Warring was a referee for the Florida State Athletic Commission in Shin Do Kumate and boxing.

Fighting records

Professional boxing

Professional MMA

|-  bgcolor="#FFBBBB"
| 1995-10-17 || Loss || align=left |  Renzo Gracie || WCC 1 – First Strike, Final || Charlotte, North Carolina, United States || Submission (Ezekiel Choke) || 1 || 2:47
|-  bgcolor="#CCFFCC"
| 1995-10-17 || Win || align=left |  Erik Paulson || WCC 1 – First Strike, Semi-final || Charlotte, North Carolina, United States || TKO (Corner stoppage) || 1 || 16:08
|-  bgcolor="#CCFFCC"
| 1995-10-17 || Win || align=left |  Jerome Turcan || WCC 1 – First Strike, Quarter-final || Charlotte, North Carolina, United States || TKO (Punches) || 1 || 2:35
|-
| colspan=9 | Legend:

Professional kickboxing

|-  bgcolor="#FFBBBB"
| 1997-10-17 || Loss || align=left |  Peter Aerts || K-1 Grand Prix '97 1st Round || Osaka, Osaka, Japan || KO (Right high kick) || 3 || 1:13
|-
| colspan=9 | Legend:

Amateur kickboxing

|-  bgcolor="#CCFFCC"
| ? || Win || align=left |  Vitali Klitschko || WAKO || United States || Decision (Split) || 12 ||
|-
| colspan=9 | Legend:

References

External links
 
 

Boxers from Florida
Cruiserweight boxers
American male kickboxers
Kickboxers from Florida
Cruiserweight kickboxers
Heavyweight kickboxers 
American male mixed martial artists
Mixed martial artists utilizing boxing
Living people
International Boxing Federation champions
World cruiserweight boxing champions
Mixed martial arts referees
1958 births
American male boxers